Petrus Leonardus Bastiaan Antonius "Pieter" van Geel (born 8 April 1951) is a retired Dutch politician Christian Democratic Appeal (CDA) party and urban planner.

He was State Secretary of Housing, Spatial Planning and the Environment from 2002 until 2007 and a member of the House of Representatives in 2002, 2003 and from 2006 till 2010.

Decorations

References

External links

Official
  Drs. P.L.B.A. (Pieter) van Geel Parlement & Politiek

 

 

1951 births
Living people
Christian Democratic Appeal politicians
Dutch nonprofit directors
Dutch political consultants
Dutch urban planners
Knights of the Order of Orange-Nassau
Members of the House of Representatives (Netherlands)
Members of the Provincial Council of North Brabant
Members of the Provincial-Executive of North Brabant
People from Roosendaal
People from Valkenswaard
Radboud University Nijmegen alumni
State Secretaries for Housing and Spatial Planning of the Netherlands
20th-century Dutch civil servants
20th-century Dutch politicians
21st-century Dutch civil servants
21st-century Dutch politicians